Alfeld is a town in Lower Saxony, Germany.

Alfeld may also refer to:

Alfeld, Bavaria, a municipality in Nürnberger Land, Bavaria, Germany

People with the surname
Robin Alfeld (born 1956), New Zealand rugby league player